Franco Galbiati (22 May 1938 – 2 April 2013) was an Italian sprinter. He competed in the men's 100 metres at the 1956 Summer Olympics.

References

External links
 

1938 births
2013 deaths
Athletes (track and field) at the 1956 Summer Olympics
Italian male sprinters
Olympic athletes of Italy
Sportspeople from Monza